Jérôme Lambert (born 7 June 1957) is a former member of the National Assembly of France. He represented Charente's 3rd constituency across 5 decades,  and was a member of the Socialiste, radical, citoyen et divers gauche.

He lost his seat in the first round of the 2022 French legislative election.

References

1957 births
Living people
Socialist Party (France) politicians
Deputies of the 9th National Assembly of the French Fifth Republic
Deputies of the 8th National Assembly of the French Fifth Republic
Deputies of the 11th National Assembly of the French Fifth Republic
Deputies of the 12th National Assembly of the French Fifth Republic
Deputies of the 13th National Assembly of the French Fifth Republic
Deputies of the 14th National Assembly of the French Fifth Republic

Deputies of the 15th National Assembly of the French Fifth Republic
21st-century French politicians
Mitterrand family